Rodney Stoke is a small village and civil parish, located at , 5 miles north-west of Wells, in the English county of Somerset. The village is on the A371 between Draycott and Westbury-sub-Mendip.

The parish includes the larger village of Draycott.  South of the A371 the parish includes an area of the Somerset Levels, extending to the River Axe.  North of the A371 the southern slopes of the Mendip Hills rise to an area of the parish on the Mendip plateau.  The parish is therefore an area of high biodiversity supporting local rare species of plants and animal life.

History

Close to the village is Westbury Camp, which represents the remains of an Iron Age enclosed settlement and has been designated as a Scheduled Ancient Monument.

Rodney Stoke was listed in the Domesday Book of 1086 as Stoches, meaning 'a stockaded settlement' from the Old English stoc. In 1291 the place name was recorded as Stokgifford. The Giffords were Saxon nobility at the time of Edward the Confessor with Walter Gifford (then spelt Gifard) as the Earl of Buckingham.

The parish was part of the Winterstoke Hundred.

The village was the home of, and is probably named after, Sir John Rodney (d. 1400). However Ekwall indicates that Stoke Gifford was held by Richard de Rodene in 1303.

The first Baron Rodney was George Brydges Rodney (1718/19–92), a British naval admiral of Napoleonic times.

It is one of the nine Thankful Villages in Somerset which suffered no fatalities during World War I.  There is a memorial window in the Parish Church together with a new plaque that testifies to the village's enduring pride in their good fortune.

Governance

The parish council has responsibility for local issues, including setting an annual precept (local rate) to cover the council's operating costs and producing annual accounts for public scrutiny. The parish council evaluates local planning applications and works with the local police, district council officers, and neighbourhood watch groups on matters of crime, security, and traffic. The parish council's role also includes initiating projects for the maintenance and repair of parish facilities, as well as consulting with the district council on the maintenance, repair, and improvement of highways, drainage, footpaths, public transport, and street cleaning. Conservation matters (including trees and listed buildings) and environmental issues are also the responsibility of the council.

The village falls within the Non-metropolitan district of Mendip, which was formed on 1 April 1974 under the Local Government Act 1972, having previously been part of Wells Rural District, which is responsible for local planning and building control, local roads, council housing, environmental health, markets and fairs, refuse collection and recycling, cemeteries and crematoria, leisure services, parks, and tourism.

Somerset County Council is responsible for running the largest and most expensive local services such as education, social services, libraries, main roads, public transport, policing and fire services, trading standards, waste disposal and strategic planning.

The village is in the 'Rodney and Westbury' electoral ward. The ward starts in the north west at Draycott and passes through Rodney Stoke to end at Westbury-sub-Mendip. The total population of the ward as at the 2011 census was 2,127.

It is also part of the Wells county constituency represented in the House of Commons of the Parliament of the United Kingdom. It elects one Member of Parliament (MP) by the first past the post system of election.

Geography

The land is noteworthy for its importance as a flight corridor and feeding ground for the Greater Horseshoe Bat. Cheddar Complex, a Site of Special Scientific Interest, lies to the north and Mascalls' Wood, an ancient woodland and Somerset Wildlife Trust Nature Reserve, lies to the west. The cross roads may be the site of an old Roman road.

Close to the village is the Rodney Stoke nature reserve, which is a Site of Special Scientific Interest (SSSI).

Religious sites

The church of St Leonard, was built around 1175 and is a Grade I listed building. The interior of the church contains a screen, bearing the date 1624, the gift of Sir Edward Rodney, which includes a representation of the martyrdom of St Erasmus, who was killed by having his entrails removed.

References

External links

 Map of Bradley Cross c1900

Villages in Mendip District
Civil parishes in Somerset
Mendip Hills